Fjernsynsteatret was a department of the Norwegian Broadcasting Corporation (NRK) which produced plays for television broadcasting. It opened in 1960 (after about a year of experimental operation), and operated until 1990, when a major reorganisation of NRK took place.

Its first leader was Arild Brinchmann, who headed the theatre from its start until 1967.  Later directors were Tore Breda Thoresen from 1967 to 1980,  and Magne Bleness from 1980 to 1990.

Fjernsynsteatret's first production was a play by Peter Brook, shown 8 April 1959. The first years the theatre developed between twenty and twenty-five productions annually, and the performances were broadcast directly. Later developments saw a merge between theatre and film, the productions became more expensive, and the number of productions decreased significantly.

The theatre was replaced by NRK Drama in 1990.

References

Theatres in Norway
1960 establishments in Norway
NRK